Swallow Tales  is a studio recording by jazz guitarist John Scofield with bass guitarist Steve Swallow (for whom the album was titled) and drummer Bill Stewart. The album was released by ECM Records on 12 June 2020. The trio plays nine re-arranged Steve Swallow compositions.

Reception
Chris Pearson in his review for The Times wrote, "This set, taped in half a day by a trio led by the American guitarist John Scofield, centres on that legacy to set the record straight." A review by RTE.ie stated, "In sum, a collection of sensitive, knowing interpretations of the Swallow classics which you should let play continuously until the inevitable result - you will need its sound in your life for a while, weaving in and out of your rooms." Matt Collar of AllMusic added, "The album arrives on the heels of several other Scofield small group sessions, including 2017's Hudson and 2018's Combo 66... It's a sound whose earthy lilt sometimes has the feel of a three-member vocal group, rather than an instrumental trio." Will Layman of PopMatters commented, "The jazz guitar trio is a classic format, and John Scofield, Steve Swallow, and Bill Stewart are as well-equipped as many musicians could be to venerate it and renew it a bit. That is the accomplishment of Swallow Tales." Michael Ullman  in his review for The Arts Fuse noted, "This is an intelligent, inventively performed, be-boppish tribute to a composer I now know better than ever."

Track listing

Personnel
John Scofield – guitar
Steve Swallow – bass
Bill Stewart – drums

Charts

References 

2020 albums
John Scofield albums
Steve Swallow albums
ECM Records albums
Albums produced by Manfred Eicher